Chinook Peak is a  mountain summit located in the Canadian Rockies of Alberta, Canada.

Description

Chinook Peak is situated 10 kilometers southwest of the town of Coleman in the Crowsnest Pass area and can be seen from Highway 3, the Crowsnest Highway. It is set on land managed by Castle Wildland Provincial Park. Precipitation runoff from the mountain drains into tributaries of the nearby Crowsnest River. Topographic relief is significant as the summit rises 1,300 meters (4,265 feet) above the river in 4.5 kilometers (2.8 miles).

History

Chinook Peak was named by Jim Kerr, a resident of the Crowsnest Pass. Jim knew that when snow started blowing from the top from the west, a chinook wind would soon follow. When mapping this area,  Dr. Raymond A. Price of the Geological Survey of Canada mapping this area, used this name to identify the peak. The mountain's toponym was officially adopted in 1962 by the Geographical Names Board of Canada.

Geology
Chinook Peak is composed of sedimentary rock laid down during the Precambrian to Jurassic periods. Formed in shallow seas, this sedimentary rock was pushed east and over the top of younger Cretaceous period rock during the Laramide orogeny.

Climate
Based on the Köppen climate classification, Chinook Peak has an alpine subarctic climate with cold, snowy winters, and mild summers. Temperatures can drop below −20 °C with wind chill factors below −30 °C.

Gallery

See also
Geology of Alberta

References

External links
 Chinook Peak weather forecast
 Climbing Chinook Peak (photos): Anugara.net

Two-thousanders of Alberta
Canadian Rockies
Chinook Jargon place names
Crowsnest Pass, Alberta